93 Leonis (93 Leo) is a binary star in the constellation Leo. Its apparent magnitude is 4.522. Based on the system's parallax, 93 Leonis is located about 233 light-years (71 parsecs) away.

93 Leonis is a double-lined spectroscopic binary. Two components are known to exist, because their spectral lines shift periodically, due to the Doppler effect. The two stars are a G-type red giant and an A-type main-sequence star. They complete an orbit once every 71.69 days. The system is also known to be an RS Canum Venaticorum variable, due to its binarity. For that reason, it has been given the variable star designation DQ Leonis.

In Chinese astronomy, 93 Leonis is called 太子, Pinyin: Tàizǐ, meaning Crown Prince, because this star is marking itself and stand alone in Crown Prince asterism, Supreme Palace enclosure mansion (see : Chinese constellation).

References

Leo (constellation)
G-type giants
A-type main-sequence stars
Leonis, 93
Spectroscopic binaries
Durchmusterung objects
102509
057565
4527
Leonis, DQ
RS Canum Venaticorum variables